Events from the year 1978 in North Korea.

Incumbents
Premier: Li Jong-ok 
Supreme Leader: Kim Il-sung

Events

Date unknown
 The North Korean government kidnaps Romanian painter Doina Bumbea.

Births

 23 January - Sin Yong-nam.
 9 August - Han Jong-in.
 16 August - Ri Kum-suk.
 19 September - Kim Hyang-mi.
 29 September - Mun In-guk.

See also
Years in Japan
Years in South Korea

References

 
North Korea
1970s in North Korea
Years of the 20th century in North Korea
North Korea